Alberto Martín Magret (born 20 August 1978) is a retired tennis player from Spain. He won three singles titles and reached five Masters Series quarterfinals on clay.

Tennis career
Martín turned professional in 1995. He won three singles titles and achieved a career-high singles ranking of world No. 34 in June 2001.

His best Grand Slam performance was reaching the fourth round of Roland Garros in 2006. En route to this performance, Martín's first-round win was his first victory over former world No. 1, Andy Roddick, in their fifth encounter. Martín led by two sets when Roddick retired with an ankle injury. Martín also beat No. 1 seed, Lleyton Hewitt, in the first round of the 2002 Australian Open, though Hewitt was recovering from chickenpox at the time of his victory.

Martín suffered the heaviest defeat in the history of the Australian Open. Andy Murray beat him in the first round of the 2007 tournament, 6–0, 6–0, 6–1. Martín had to wait until the penultimate game of the match before winning his only game.

In 2004, Martín was a member of the victorious Spain Davis Cup team for the Davis Cup first round against Czech Republic in Brno, although he did not play. 

In 2017, he was a member of the victorious H30 Team of TV Ober-Eschbach which got promoted to the Bezirks-Oberliga (HTV) in 2018.

ATP Tour career finals

Singles: 5 (3 titles, 2 runner-ups)

Doubles: 6 (3 titles, 3 runner-ups)

ATP Challenger and ITF Futures finals

Singles: 14 (5–9)

Doubles: 19 (7–12)

Performance timelines

Singles

Doubles

Junior Grand Slam finals

Singles: 1 (1 title)

Top 10 wins per season

Wins over top-ten players per season

Notes

References

External links
 
 
 
 Alberto Martín at TV Ober-Eschbach

1978 births
Tennis players from Catalonia
French Open junior champions
Living people
Spanish male tennis players
Tennis players from Barcelona
Mediterranean Games medalists in tennis
Mediterranean Games silver medalists for Spain
Mediterranean Games bronze medalists for Spain
Competitors at the 1997 Mediterranean Games
Grand Slam (tennis) champions in boys' singles